Beisler is a surname. Notable people with the surname include:

 Frank Beisler (1911–1973), American ice hockey player
 Jerry Beisler (1942–2020), American writer and cannabis activist
 Randy Beisler (born 1944), American football player

See also
 Besler (disambiguation)